Bradford is an unincorporated community in Morgan Township, Harrison County, Indiana.

History
Bradford was platted in 1838. The Bradford post office was established in 1844.

Geography

References

Unincorporated communities in Harrison County, Indiana
Unincorporated communities in Indiana
Louisville metropolitan area
Populated places established in 1838
1838 establishments in Indiana